Child marriage is a marriage or similar union, formal or informal, between a child under a certain age – typically 18 years – and an adult or another child. The vast majority of child marriages are between a female child and a male adult, and are rooted in gender inequality.

Although the age of majority (legal adulthood) and marriageable age are usually designated at age 18, both vary across countries, and therefore the marriageable age may be older or younger in a given country. Even where the age is set at 18 years, cultural traditions may override legislation and many jurisdictions permit earlier marriage with parental consent or in special circumstances, such as teenage pregnancy.

Child marriage violates the rights of children and has long-term consequences for both child brides and child grooms. For child brides, in addition to mental health issues and lack of access to education and career opportunities, these include adverse health effects as a result of early pregnancy and childbirth. Effects on child grooms include being ill-prepared for certain responsibilities such as providing for the family, early fatherhood, and a lack of access to education and career opportunities. Child marriage is part of the practice of child betrothal, which often includes civil cohabitation and a court-approval of the engagement Causes of child marriages include poverty, bride price, dowries, cultural traditions, religious and social pressures, regional customs, fear of the child remaining unmarried into adulthood, illiteracy, and perceived inability of women to work for money. Research indicates that comprehensive sex education can help to prevent child marriage. Reducing child marriage in developing countries requires educating and strengthening the rural community. Girls may make better life and marriage decisions with education. Rural development programs like healthcare, water, and sanitation may aid families financially and minimize child marriage. Education and rural development may break the cycle of poverty and child marriage.

Child marriages have been common throughout history and continue to be widespread, particularly in developing countries such as parts of Africa, South Asia, Southeast Asia, West Asia, Latin America, and Oceania. However, even in developed countries, legal exceptions still allow child marriage including exceptions in 44 US states.

The incidence of child marriage has been falling in most parts of the world. 2018 data from UNICEF showed that about 21 percent of young women worldwide (aged from 20 to 24) were married as children, a 25 percent decrease from 10 years ago. The countries with the highest observed rates of child marriages (below the age of 18) were Niger, Chad, Mali, Bangladesh, Guinea, the Central African Republic, Mozambique, and Nepal, all of which had rates above 50%. Niger, Chad, Bangladesh, Mali, and Ethiopia were the countries with child marriage rates greater than 20% below the age of 15, according to multiple 2003–2009 surveys. Each year, an estimated 12 million girls globally become married under the age of 18.

In 2021, 13.3 million babies, or about 10 percent of the total worldwide, were born to mothers under 20 years old.

History

Before the industrial revolution, women around the world, particularly in India, China, and Eastern Europe, often married at an early age—usually soon after reaching puberty.

These practices carried well into the 19th century in societies with largely rural populations. Men tended to marry later in societies where a married couple was expected to establish a household of their own. That usually meant that men remained unmarried until they accumulated sufficient wealth to support a new home, and were married in their mature age to adolescent girls.

In ancient and medieval societies, it was common for girls to be betrothed at or even before the age of puberty. According to Mordechai A. Friedman, "arranging and contracting the marriage of a young girl were the undisputed prerogatives of her father in ancient Israel." Most girls were married before the age of 15, often at the start of their puberty. In the Middle Ages, the age at marriage seems to have been around puberty throughout the Jewish world.

Ruth Lamdan writes: "The numerous references to child marriage in the 16th-century Responsa literature and other sources, shows that child marriage was so common, it was virtually the norm. In this context, it is important to remember that in halakha, the term "minor" refers to a girl under twelve years and a day. A girl aged twelve and a half was already considered an adult in all respects."

In Ancient Greece, early marriage and teenage motherhood for girls existed. Boys were expected to marry in their teens, as well. In the Roman Empire, girls were married from age of 12 and boys from age 14. In the Middle Ages, under English civil laws derived from Roman laws, marriages before the age of 16 existed. In Imperial China, child marriage was the norm.

In contrast to other pre-modern societies – and for reasons that are subject to debate – Northwest Europe was characterized by relatively late marriages for both men and women, with both sexes commonly delaying marriage until their mid-20s or even 30s. The data available for England suggest this was the case by the 14th century. The pattern was reflected in English common law, which was the first in Western Europe to establish statutory rape laws and ages of consent for marriage. In 1275, sexual relations with girls under either 12 or 14 (depending on interpretation of the sources) were criminalized; a second law was made with more severe punishments for under the age of 10 in 1576. In the late 18th and early 19th centuries, the British colonial administration introduced marriage age restrictions for Hindu and Muslim girls on the Indian subcontinent.

A Scottish physician living in the 18th century Syria reported that locals tried to contract marriages for their children at a young age, but the marriage was not consummated until the girl "had come of age". Evidence from 19th century Palestine suggests that husbands sometimes initiated sexual relations before their wives reached puberty, but that it was a rare occurrence, condemned socially and censured by sharia courts. Writing in the 1830s, Edward William Lane observed that few Egyptian girls remained single by the age of 16, but socio-economic transformation, educational reforms and modernity brought significant changes, and by 1920 fewer than 10% of Egyptian women married before the age of 20. In 1923, Egypt's parliament set the minimum age of marriage at 16 for women and 18 for men.

Religious norms and laws 
Most of the religions which have been practiced throughout history have established a minimum age for marriage in one way or another. Christian canon law forbade the marriage of a girl before the onset of puberty. The Hindu Vedas, specifically the Rigveda and Atharvaveda, have verses that indicate that during the Vedic period, girls married well after attaining puberty and were of a mature age. The early Dharmaśāstra also states that girls should be married after they have attained puberty while some texts extend the marriageable age to before puberty. In the Manusmriti, which was not implemented as law, a father is considered to have wronged his daughter if he fails to marry her before puberty and if the girl is not married in less than three years after reaching puberty, she can search for the husband herself.

Jewish scholars and rabbis strongly discouraged marriages before the onset of puberty, but at the same time, in exceptional cases, girls ages 3 through 12 (the legal age of consent according to halakha) might be given in marriage by their fathers. By Judaism, the minimum girl age, for marriage, was 12 years and one day, "na'arah", as mentioned in the ancient Talmud Mishnah books (compiled between 536 BCE – 70 CE, redacted in the 3rd century CE), Order Nashim Masechet Kiddushin 41 a & b.

According to halakha, girls should not marry until they are 12 years and six months old, "bogeret". Although Moses Maimonides mentions in the Talmud Mishneh Torah (compiled between 1170 and 1180 CE) that in exceptional cases girls ages 3 through 12 might be given in marriage by their fathers, he also clarifies in verse 3:19 of the same chapter that: "Although a father has the option of consecrating his daughter to anyone he desires while she is a minor or while she is a maiden, it is not proper for him to act in this manner."

Historically within the Catholic Church, before the 1917 Code of Canon Law, the minimum age for a dissoluble betrothal was seven years in the s. The minimum age for a valid marriage was puberty, or nominally 14 for males and 12 for females. The 1917 Code of Canon Law raised the minimum age for a valid marriage at 16 for males and 14 for females. The 1983 Code of Canon Law maintained the minimum age for a valid marriage at 16 for males and 14 for females.

English Ecclesiastical Law forbade the marriage of a girl before the age of puberty.

There is no minimum marriage age defined in traditional Islamic law, and the legal discussion of this topic centered primarily on women's physical maturity. Classical Sunni jurisprudence allows a father to contract a marriage for his underaged daughter. The appropriate age for consummating the marriage, which could occur several years after signing the marriage contract, was to be determined by the bride, groom, and the bride's guardian since medieval jurists held that the age of fitness for intercourse was too variable for legislation. This was based in part on the precedent set by the Islamic prophet Muhammad, as described in the hadith collections considered to be authentic by Muslims. According to these sources, Muhammad married Aisha, his third wife, when she was about six, and consummated the marriage when she was about nine.{{efn|Most sources suggest age at consummation as nine, and one that it may have been age 10; See: Denise Spellberg (1996), Politics, Gender, and the Islamic Past: The Legacy of 'A'isha Bint Abi Bakr, 
Columbia University Press, pp. 39–40;The Ahmadiyya minority sect has published Pakistan's Muhammad Ali view that Sahih al-Bukhari is unauthentic, and argued that Aisha may have been a teenager; See: However, Ahmadiyya sect views about Islam and its history are widely disputed by mainstream Islam. See: Siddiq & Ahmad (1995), Enforced Apostasy: Zaheeruddin v. State and the Official Persecution of the Ahmadiyya Community in Pakistan, Law & Inequality'-, 14: pp. 275–284.}} Some modern Muslim authors and Islamic scholars, such as Ali Gomaa, who served as the Grand Mufti of Egypt, doubt the traditionally accepted narrative and believe based on other evidence that Aisha was in her late teens at the time of her marriage. As a general rule, intercourse was prohibited for girls "not able to undergo it," on the grounds of potential physical harm. Disputes regarding physical maturity between the involved parties were to be resolved by a judge, potentially after examination by a female expert witness. The 1917 Codification of Islamic Family Law in the Ottoman Empire distinguished between the age of competence for marriage, which was set at 18 for boys and 17 for girls, and the minimum age for marriage, set at 12 for boys and 9 for girls. Marriage below the age of competence was permissible only if proof of sexual maturity was accepted in court, while marriage under the minimum age was forbidden. During the 20th century, sharia-based legislation in most countries in the Middle East followed the Ottoman precedent in defining the age of competence, while raising the minimum age to 15 or 16 for boys and 13 to 16 for girls. In 2019, Saudi Arabia raised the age of marriage to 18.

Although by the beginning of the 21st century, the laws of most countries have established the general minimum age for marriage at 18 years, in many countries some exceptions allow marriage before this age with the consent of the parents and/or by court decision. In some countries, a religious marriage is still recognized by the state authorities while in others, a registered civil marriage is mandatory.

Effects on each gender
Child marriage has lasting consequences on girls, from their health (mental and physical), education and social development perspectives. These consequences last well beyond adolescence. One of the most common causes of death for girls aged 15 to 19 in developing countries was pregnancy and childbirth. In Niger, which is estimated to have the highest rate of child marriage in the world, about 3 in 4 girls marry before their 18th birthday. 

Boys are sometimes married as children, almost always to a female minor. UNICEF states that "girls [are] disproportionately affected by the practice. Globally, the prevalence of child marriage among boys is just one-sixth that among girls." Research on the effects of child marriage on underage boys is scant, which researchers state is likely because child marriage involving boys is less common and boys do not face the adverse health effects as a result of early pregnancy and childbirth. The effects of child marriage on boys include being ill-prepared for certain responsibilities such as providing for the family, early fatherhood, and a lack of access to education and career opportunities. , 156 million living men were married as underage boys.

In its first in-depth analysis of child grooms, UNICEF revealed that an estimated 115 million boys and men around the world were married as children. Of these, 1 in 5, or 23 million, boys were married before the age of 15. According to the data, the Central African Republic has the highest prevalence of child marriage among males (28%), followed by Nicaragua (19%) and Madagascar (13%). The estimates bring the total number of child brides and child grooms to 765 million. Girls remain disproportionately affected, with 1 in 5 young women aged 20 to 24 years old married before their 18th birthday, compared to 1 in 30 young men.

Causes

According to UNFPA, factors that promote and reinforce child marriage include poverty and economic survival strategies; gender inequality; sealing land or property deals or settling disputes; control over sexuality and protecting family honor; tradition and culture; and insecurity, particularly during war, famine or epidemics. Other factors include family ties in which marriage is a means of consolidating powerful relations between families.

Dowry and bride price

Providing a girl with a dowry at her marriage is an ancient practice which continues in some parts of the world, especially in the Indian subcontinent. Parents bestow property on the marriage of a daughter as a dowry, which is often an economic challenge for many families. The difficulty to save and preserve wealth for dowry was common, particularly in times of economic hardship, or persecution, or unpredictable seizure of property and savings. These difficulties pressed families to betroth their girls, irrespective of her age, as soon as they had the resources to pay the dowry. Thus, Goitein notes that European Jews would marry their girls early, once they had collected the expected amount of dowry.

A bride price is the amount paid by the groom to the parents of a bride for them to consent to him marrying their daughter. In some countries, the younger the bride, the higher the bride price. This practice creates an economic incentive where girls are sought and married early by her family to the highest bidder. Child marriages of girls is a way out of desperate economic conditions, or simply a source of income to the parents. Bride price is another cause of child marriage and child trafficking.

Bride kidnapping

Bride kidnapping, also known as bridenapping, marriage by abduction or marriage by capture, is a practice in which a male abducts the female he wishes to marry. Bride kidnapping has been practiced around the world and throughout history. It continues to occur in countries in Central Asia, the Caucasus region, and parts of Africa, and among people as diverse as the Hmong in Southeast Asia, the Tzeltal in Mexico, and the Romani in Europe.

In most nations, bride kidnapping is considered a crime rather than a valid form of marriage. Some types of it may also be seen as falling along the continuum between forced marriage and arranged marriage. However, even when the practice is against the law, judicial enforcement remains lax in some areas. Bride kidnapping occurs in various parts of the world, but it is most common in the Caucasus and Central Asia. Bride kidnapping is often a form of child marriage. It may be connected to the practice of bride price, and the inability or unwillingness to pay it.

Persecution, forced migration, and slavery
Social upheavals such as wars, major military campaigns, forced religious conversion, taking natives as prisoners of war and converting them into slaves, arrest and forced migrations of people often made a suitable groom a rare commodity. Bride's families would seek out any available bachelors and marry them to their daughters before events beyond their control moved the boy away. Persecution and displacement of Roma and Jewish people in Europe, colonial campaigns to get slaves from various ethnic groups in West Africa across the Atlantic for plantations, Islamic campaigns to get Hindu slaves from India across Afghanistan's Hindu Kush as property and for work, were some of the historical events that increased the practice of child marriage before the 19th century.Andre Wink (1997), Al-Hind: the Making of the Indo-Islamic World, vol. 2, The Slave Kings and the Islamic Conquest, 11th–13th Centuries (Leiden)

Among Sephardi Jewish communities, child marriages became frequent from the 10th to 13th centuries, especially in Muslim Spain. This practice intensified after the Jewish community was expelled from Spain, and resettled in the Ottoman Empire. Child marriages among the Eastern Sephardic Jews continued through the 18th century in Islamic majority regions.Ruth Lamdan, Child Marriages in Jewish Society in Eastern Mediterranean during the 16th Century, Mediterranean Historical Review, 2 (June 1996); Vol 11, pages 37–59

Fear, poverty, social pressures and a sense of protection

A sense of social insecurity is a cause of child marriages across the world. For example, in Nepal, parents fear social stigma if adult daughters (past 18 years) stay at home. Others fear crimes such as rape, which not only would be traumatic but may lead to less acceptance of the girl if she becomes a victim of such a crime. For example, girls may not be seen as eligible for marriage if they are not virgins. In other cultures, the fear is that an unmarried girl may engage in illicit relationships, or elope, causing a permanent social blemish to her siblings, or that the impoverished family may be unable to find bachelors for grown-up girls in their socioeconomic group. Such fears and social pressures have been proposed as causes that lead to child marriages. Insofar as child marriage is a social norm in practicing communities, the elimination of child marriage must come through a changing of those social norms. The mindset of the communities, and what is believed to be the proper outcome for a child bride, must be shifted to bring about a change in the prevalence of child marriage.

Extreme poverty may make daughters an economic burden on the family, which may be relieved by their early marriage, to the benefit of the family as well as the girl herself. Poor parents may have few alternatives they can afford for the girls in the family; they often view marriage as a means to ensure their daughter's financial security and to reduce the economic burden of a growing adult on the family.Asad Zia, 42% of underage married girls from Pakistan, Express Tribune / International Herald Tribune (New York Times), 2 January 2013 Child marriage can also be seen as means of ensuring a girl's economic security, particularly if she lacks family members to provide for her. In reviews of Jewish community history, scholarsA. Grossman, 'Child marriage in Jewish society in the Middle Ages until the thirteenth century' (in Hebrew), Peamim 45 (1990), 108–126 claim poverty, shortage of grooms, uncertain social and economic conditions were a cause of frequent child marriages.

An additional factor causing child marriage is the parental belief that early marriage offers protection. Parents feel that marriage provides their daughter with a sense of protection from sexual promiscuity and safe from sexually transmitted infections. However, in reality, young girls tend to marry older men, placing them at an increased risk of contracting a sexually transmitted infection.

Protection through marriage may play a specific role in conflict settings. Families may have their young daughters marry members of an armed group or military in hopes that they will be better protected. Girls may also be taken by armed groups and forced into marriages.

Religion, culture and civil law
Although the general marriageable age is 18 in the majority of countries, most jurisdictions allow for exceptions for underage youth with parental and/or judicial consent. Such laws are neither limited to developing countries, nor a state's religion. In some countries, a religious marriage by itself has legal validity, while in others it does not, as civil marriage is obligatory. For Catholics incorporated into the Latin Church, the 1983 Code of Canon Law sets the minimum age for a valid marriage at 16 for males and 14 for females. In 2015, Spain raised its minimum marriageable age to 18 (16 with court consent) from the previous 14. In Mexico, marriage under 18 is allowed with parental consent, from age 14 for girls and age 16 for boys. In Ukraine, in 2012, the Family Code was amended to equalize the marriageable age for girls and boys to 18, with courts being allowed to grant permission to marry from 16 years of age if it is established that the marriage is in the best interest of the youth.

Many states in the US permit child marriages, with the court's permission. Since 2015, the minimum marriageable age throughout Canada is 16. In Canada the age of majority is set by province/territory at 18 or 19, so minors under this age have additional restrictions (i.e. parental and court consent). Under the Criminal Code, Art. 293.2 Marriage under the age of 16 years reads: "Everyone who celebrates, aids or participates in a marriage rite or ceremony knowing that one of the persons being married is under the age of 16 years is guilty of an indictable offense and liable to imprisonment for a term not exceeding five years." The Civil Marriage Act also states: "2.2 No person who is under the age of 16 years may contract marriage." In the UK, marriage is allowed for 16–17 years old with parental consent in England and Wales as well as in Northern Ireland, and even without parental consent in Scotland. However, a marriage of a person under 16 is void under the Matrimonial Causes Act 1973. The United Nations Population Fund stated the following:

Lower legally allowed marriage age does not necessarily cause high rates of child marriages. However, there is a correlation between restrictions placed by laws and the average age of first marriage. In the United States, per 1960 Census data, 3.5% of girls married before the age of 16, while an additional 11.9% married between 16 and 18. States with lower marriage age limits saw higher percentages of child marriages. This correlation between the higher age of marriage in civil law and the observed frequency of child marriages breaks down in countries with Islam as the state religion. In Islamic nations, many countries do not allow child marriage of girls under their civil code of laws. But, the state recognized Sharia religious laws and courts in all these nations have the power to override the civil code, and often do. UNICEF reports that the top eight nations in the world with the highest observed child marriage rates are Niger (75%), Chad (72%), Mali (71%), Bangladesh (64%), Guinea (63%), Central African Republic (61%), Mozambique (56%), and Nepal (51%).

Marriageable age in religious sources

Judaism
Ancient Rabbis set the age of marriage for every Israelite at 18 years old; males are expected to be married by 20 years old in teenage marriage and females can stay unmarried but must be celibate.

In Rabbinic Judaism, males cannot consent to marriage until they reach the age of 13 years and a day and have undergone puberty. They are considered minors until the age of twenty. The same rules apply to females, except their age is 12 years and a day. If females show no signs of puberty and males show no signs of puberty or do show impotence, they automatically become adults by age 35 and can marry.

A large age gap between spouses, in either direction, is advised against as unwise. A younger woman marrying a significantly older man however is especially problematic: marrying one's young daughter to an old man was declared as reprehensible as forcing her into prostitution.

A ketannah (literally meaning "little [one]") was any girl between the age of 3 years and 12 years plus one day; she was subject to her father's authority, and he could arrange a marriage for her without her agreement. However, after reaching the age of maturity, she would have to agree to the marriage to be considered married.

Catholic Church
The minimum ages of consent for marriage in the Catholic Church are 14 for girls and 16 for boys. Being underage constitutes a diriment impediment. That is, a marriage involving an underage bride or groom is canonically invalid. A Conference of Bishops may adopt a higher age for marriage, but in that case, the higher age only creates a prohibitive impediment, that is, a marriage involving a bride or groom above the Church's minimum age but below that set by the Conference is valid but illicit. Permission to marry against a civil authority's directive requires the permission of the Ordinary, which, in the case of sensible and equal laws regarding marriage age, is not usually granted. The permission by the Ordinary is also required in case of a marriage of a minor when their parents are unaware of his marriage or if their parents reasonably oppose the marriage.

Islam
In classical Islamic law, suitability for marital relations is conditional on physical maturity (bulugh) and mental maturity (rushd). Classical jurists did not stipulate a minimum marriageable age because they did not believe that maturity is reached by everyone at a specific age. Büchler and Schlater observe that "marriageable age according to classical Islamic law coincides with the occurrence of puberty. The notion of puberty refers to signs of physical maturity such as the emission of semen or the onset of menstruation". Traditional schools of Islamic jurisprudence (madhaahib) define the age of full legal capacity to enter marriage as follows:

According to Büchler and Schlater, while marriageable age is not the same as the legal majority under civil law, these age limits may correspond.

The 1917 codification of Islamic family law in the Ottoman Empire distinguished between the age of competence for marriage, which was set at 18 for boys and 17 for girls, and the minimum age for marriage, which followed the traditional Hanafi ages of the legal majority of 12 for boys and 9 for girls. Marriage below the age of competence was permissible only if proof of sexual maturity was accepted in court, while marriage under the minimum age was forbidden. During the 20th century, most countries in the Middle East followed the Ottoman precedent in defining the age of competence, while raising the minimum age to 15 or 16 for boys and 13–16 for girls. Marriage below the age of competence is subject to approval by a judge and the legal guardian of the adolescent. Egypt diverged from this pattern by setting the age limits of 18 for boys and 16 for girls, without a distinction between competence for marriage and minimum age. In 2020, Saudi Arabia officially banned all marriages under the age of 18. The push to ban child marriage was initially opposed by senior clergy, who argued that a woman reaches adulthood at puberty. However, by 2019 the Saudi Shura Council had outlawed marriages under the age of 15, and required court approval for those under 18.

Politics and financial relationships

Child marriages may depend upon socio-economic status. The aristocracy in some cultures, as in the European feudal era tended to use child marriage as a method to secure political ties. Families were able to cement political and/or financial ties by having their children marry. The betrothal is considered a binding contract between the families and the children. The breaking of a betrothal can have serious consequences both for the families and for the betrothed individuals themselves.

Effects on global regions

A UNFPA report stated, "For the period 2000–2011, just over one third (an estimated 34 percent) of women aged 20 to 24 years in developing regions were married or in union before their eighteenth birthday. In 2010 this was equivalent to almost 67 million women. About 12 percent of them were married or in union before age 15." The prevalence of child marriage varies substantially among countries. Around the world, girls from rural areas are twice as likely to marry as children as those from urban areas.

Africa

According to UNICEF, Africa has the highest incidence rates of child marriage, with over 50% of girls marrying under the age of eighteen in five nations. Girls in West and Central Africa have the highest risk of marrying in childhood. Niger has one of the highest rates of early marriage in sub-Saharan Africa. Among Nigerien women between the ages of twenty and twenty-four, 76% reported marrying before the age of eighteen and 28% reported marrying before the age of fifteen. This UNICEF report is based on data that is derived from a small sample survey between 1995 and 2004, and the current rate is unknown given the lack of infrastructure and in some cases, regional violence.

UNICEF stated in 2018 that although the number of child marriages has declined on a worldwide scale, the problem remains most severe in Africa, despite the fact that Ethiopia cut child marriage rates by a third.

African countries have enacted marriageable age laws to limit marriage to a minimum age of 16 to 18, depending on the jurisdiction. In Ethiopia, Chad and Niger, the legal marriage age is 15, but local customs and religious courts have the power to allow marriages below 12 years of age. Child marriages of girls in West Africa, Central Africa and Northeast Africa are widespread. Additionally, poverty, religion, tradition, and conflict make the rate of child marriage in Sub-Saharan Africa very high in some regions.

In many traditional systems, a man pays a bride price to the girl's family to marry her (comparable to the customs of dowry and dower). In many parts of Africa, this payment, in cash, cattle, or other valuables, decreases as a girl gets older. Even before a girl reaches puberty, it is common for a married girl to leave her parents to be with her husband. Many marriages are related to poverty, with parents needing the bride price of a daughter to feed, clothe, educate, and house the rest of the family. In Mali, the female: male ratio of marriage before age 18 is 72:1; in Kenya, 21:1.

The various reports indicate that in many Sub-Saharan countries, there is a high incidence of marriage among girls younger than 15. Many governments have tended to overlook the particular problems resulting from child marriage, including obstetric fistulae, premature births, stillbirth, sexually transmitted diseases (including cervical cancer), and malaria.

In parts of Ethiopia and Nigeria, many girls are married before the age of 15, some as young as 7 In parts of Mali, 39% of girls are married before the age of 15. In Niger and Chad, over 70% of girls are married before the age of 18.

 The Gambia 
In 2016, during a feast ending the Muslim holy month of Ramadan, Gambian President Yahya Jammeh announced that child and forced marriages were banned.

Kenya
In Kenya 23% of girls are married before age 18, including 4% by age 15.

 Malawi 
In 2015, Malawi passed a law banning child marriage, which raises the minimum age for marriage to 18. This major accomplishment came following years of effort by the Girls Empowerment Network campaign, which ultimately led to tribal and traditional leaders banning the cultural practice of child marriage.

 Morocco 
In Morocco, child marriage is a common practice. Over 41,000 marriages every year involve child brides. Before 2003, child marriages did not require a court or state's approval. In 2003, Morocco passed the family law (Moudawana) that raised the minimum age of marriage for girls from 14 to 18, with the exception that underage girls may marry with the permission of the government-recognized official/court and girl's guardian.Morocco: Underage marriages increase CRIN, Rabat (28 January 2011) Over the 10 years preceding 2008, requests for child marriages have been predominantly approved by Morocco's Ministry for Social Development, and have increased (c. 29% of all marriages). Some child marriages in Morocco are a result of Article 475 of the Moroccan penal code, a law that allows rapists to avoid punishment if they marry their underage victims. Article 475 was amended in January 2014 after much campaigning, and rapists can legally no longer avoid sentencing by marrying their victims.

 Mozambique 
In 2019, Mozambique's national assembly passed a law prohibiting child marriage. This law came after national movements condemning Mozambique's high rate of child marriage with 50% of girls marrying under the age of 18.

 Nigeria 
As of 2006, 15–20% of school dropouts in Nigeria were the result of child marriage. In 2013, Nigeria attempted to change Section 29, subsection 4 of its laws and thereby prohibit child marriages. Christianity and Islam are each practiced by roughly half of its population, and the country continues with personal laws from its British colonial-era laws, where child marriages are forbidden for its Christians and allowed for its Muslims. In Nigeria, child marriage is a divisive topic and widely practiced. In northern states, predominantly Muslim, over 50% of the girls marry before the age of 15.

 South Africa 
In South Africa, the law provides for respecting the marriage practices of traditional marriages, whereby a person might be married as young as 12 for females and 14 for males. Early marriage is cited as "a barrier to continuing education for girls (and boys)". This includes absuma (arranged marriages set up between cousins at birth in local Islamic ethnic group), bride kidnapping and elopement decided on by the children.

 Tanzania 
In 2016, the Tanzanian High Court – in a case filed by the Msichana Initiative, a lobbying group that advocates for girls' right to education – ruled in favor of protecting girls from the harms of early marriage. It is now illegal for anyone younger than 18 to marry in Tanzania.

 Zimbabwe 
A 2015 Human Rights Watch report stated that in Zimbabwe, one-third of women aged between 20 and 49 years old had married before reaching the age of 18. In January 2016, two women who had been married as children brought a court case requesting a change in the legal age of marriage to the Constitutional Court, with the result that the court declared that 18 is to be the minimum age for a legal marriage for both men and women (previously the legal age had been 16 for women and 18 for men). The law took effect immediately and was hailed by several of human rights, women's rights, medical, and legal groups as a landmark ruling for the country.

Americas

 Latin America 
Child marriage is common in Latin America and the Caribbean island nations. About 29% of girls are married before age 18. Dominican Republic, Honduras, Brazil, Guatemala, Nicaragua, Haiti and Ecuador report some of the highest rates in the Americas, while Bolivia and Guyana have shown the sharpest decline in child marriage rates as of 2012. Brazil is ranked fourth in the world in terms of absolute numbers of girls married or cohabitating by age fifteen.

Poverty and lack of laws mandating minimum age for marriage have been cited as reasons of child marriage in Latin America. In an effort to combat the widespread belief among poor, rural, and indigenous communities that child marriage is a route out of poverty, some NGOs are working with communities in Latin America to shift norms and create safe spaces for adolescent girls.

In Guatemala, early marriage is most common among indigenous Mayan communities. In southeastern Colombia, historically the indigenous Nasa sometimes married at early ages to dissuade colonizers from coercively taking girls.

Canada
Since 2015, the minimum marriageable age throughout Canada is 16. In Canada the age of majority is set by province/territory at 18 or 19, so minors under this age have additional restrictions (i.e. parental and court consent). Under the Criminal Code, Art. 293.2 Marriage under age of 16 years reads: "Everyone who celebrates, aids or participates in a marriage rite or ceremony knowing that one of the persons being married is under the age of 16 years is guilty of an indictable offence and liable to imprisonment for a term not exceeding five years." The Civil Marriage Act also states: "2.2 No person who is under the age of 16 years may contract marriage."

According to a study from McGill University, from 2000 to 2018, 3,600 marriage certificates were issued to children (mostly girls) under 18 in Canada.

United States

Child marriage, as defined by UNICEF, is observed in the United States. The UNICEF definition of child marriage includes couples who are formally married, or who live together as a sexually active couple in an informal union, with at least one member – usually the girl – being less than 18 years old. The latter practice is more common in the United States, and it is officially called cohabitation. According to a 2010 report by the United States' National Center for Health Statistics, 2.1% of all girls in the 15–17 age group were either in a child marriage or in an informal union. In the age group of 15–19, 7.6% of all girls in the United States were formally married or in an informal union. The child marriage rates were higher for certain ethnic groups and states. In Hispanic groups, for example, 6.6% of all girls in the 15–17 age group were formally married or in an informal union, and 13% of the 15–19 age group were. Over 350,000 babies are born to teenage mothers every year in the United States, and over 50,000 of these are second babies to teen mothers.

Laws regarding child marriage vary in the different states of the United States. Generally, children 16 and over may marry with parental consent, with the age of 18 being the minimum in all but two states to marry without parental consent. However all states but Delaware, New Jersey, and Pennsylvania have exceptions for child marriage within their laws, and although those under 16 generally require a court order in addition to parental consent, when those exceptions are taken into account, 17 states have no minimum age requirement.

Until 2008 the Fundamentalist Church of Jesus Christ of Latter Day Saints practiced child marriage through the concept of "spiritual marriage" as soon as it was possible for girls to bear children, as part of its polygamy practice, but laws have raised the age of legal marriage in response to criticism of the practice. In 2007 church leader Warren Jeffs was convicted of being an accomplice to statutory rape of a minor due to arranging a marriage between a 14-year-old girl and a 19-year-old man. In March 2008 officials of the state of Texas believed that children at the Yearning For Zion Ranch were being married to adults and were being abused. The state of Texas removed all 468 children from the ranch and placed them into temporary state custody. After the Austin's 3rd Court of Appeals and the Supreme Court of Texas ruled that Texas acted improperly in removing them from the YFZ Ranch, the children were returned to their parents or relatives. In 2008 the Church changed its policy in the United States to no longer marry individuals younger than the local legal age.

Between 2000 and 2015 there were at least 207,468 child marriages in the United States of which over 1,000 marriage licences were for children under 15, some as young as ten years old.

In 2018, Delaware became the first state to ban child marriage without exceptions, followed by New Jersey the same year. In 2020, Pennsylvania became the third state to ban it.

Asia
More than half of all child marriages occur in the South Asian countries of India, Pakistan, Bangladesh, and Nepal. There was a decrease in the rates of child marriage across the Indian subcontinent from 1991 to 2007, but the decrease was observed among young adolescent girls and not girls in their late teens. Some scholars believe this age-specific reduction was linked to girls increasingly attending school until about age 15 and then marrying.

Western Asia
A 2013 report claims 53% of all married women in Afghanistan were married before age 18, and 21% of all were married before age 15. Afghanistan's official minimum age of marriage for girls is 15 with her father's permission. In all 34 provinces of Afghanistan, the customary practice of ba'ad is another reason for child marriages; this custom involves village elders, jirga, settling disputes between families or unpaid debts or ruling punishment for a crime by forcing the guilty family to give their 5- to 12-year-old girls as a wife. Sometimes a girl is forced into child marriage for a crime her uncle or distant relative is alleged to have committed. Andrew Bushell claims rate of marriage of 8- to 13-year-old girls exceeding 50% in Afghan refugee camps along the Pakistan border.

Over half of Yemeni girls are married before 18, some by the age eight. Yemen government's Sharia Legislative Committee has blocked attempts to raise marriage age to either 15 or 18, on grounds that any law setting minimum age for girls is un-Islamic. Yemeni Muslim activists argue that some girls are ready for marriage at age 9. According to Human Rights Watch (HRW), in 1999 the minimum marriage age 15 for women was abolished; the onset of puberty, interpreted by conservatives to be at age nine, was set as a requirement for consummation of marriage. In practice "Yemeni law allows girls of any age to wed, but it forbids sex with them until the indefinite time they are 'suitable for sexual intercourse'." As with Africa, the marriage incidence data for Yemen in HRW report is from surveys between 1990 and 2000. Current data is difficult to obtain because of regional violence.

In April 2008, Nujood Ali, a 10-year-old girl, successfully obtained a divorce after being raped under these conditions. Her case prompted calls to raise the legal age for marriage to 18. Later in 2008, the Supreme Council for Motherhood and Childhood proposed to define the minimum age for marriage at 18 years. The law was passed in April 2009, with the age voted for as 17. But the law was dropped the next day following maneuvers by opposing parliamentarians. Negotiations to pass the legislation continue. Meanwhile, Yemenis inspired by Nujood's efforts continue to push for change, with Nujood involved in at least one rally. In September 2013, an 8-year-old girl died of internal bleeding and uterine rupture on her wedding night after marrying a 40-year-old man.

The widespread prevalence of child marriage in the Kingdom of Saudi Arabia has been documented by human rights groups. Saudi clerics have justified the marriage of girls as young as 9, with sanction from the judiciary. No laws define a minimum age of consent in Saudi Arabia, though drafts for possible laws have been created since 2011. Members of the Saudi Shoura Council in 2019 approved fresh regulations for minor marriages that will outlaw the marrying of 15-year-olds and force the need for court approval for those under 18. Chairman of the Human Rights Committee at the Shoura Council, Dr. Hadi Al-Yami, said that introduced controls were based on in-depth studies presented to the body. He pointed out that the regulation, vetted by the Islamic Affairs Committee at the Shoura Council, has raised the age of marriage to 18 and prohibited it for those under 15. Saudi Arabia has officially updated the law banning all marriages under the age of 18.

Research by the United Nations Population Fund indicates that 28.2% of marriages in Turkey – almost one in three – involve girls under 18.

Child marriage was also found to be prevalent among Syrian and Palestinian Syrian refugees in Lebanon, in addition to other forms of sexual and gender-based violence. Marriage was seen as a potential way to protect family honor and protect a girl from rape given how common rape was during the conflict. Incidents of child marriages increased in Syria and among Syrian refugees over the course of the conflict. The proportion of Syrian refugee girls living in Jordan who were married increased from 13% in 2011 to 32% in 2014. Journalists Magnus Wennman and Carina Bergfeldt documented the practice, and some of its results.

Southeast Asia
Hill tribes girls are often married young. For the Karen people it is possible that two couples can arrange their children's marriage before the children are born.

 Indonesia 
In a move to curb child marriage in Indonesia, the minimum marriage age for girls in Indonesia will be raised to 19 in 2022. Previously, under the 1974 marriage law, the marriage age for girls was 16, and there was no minimum with judicial consent.

There has been an increase in underage marriage which has been attributed to a rise in social networking sites like Facebook. It has been reported that in areas like Gunung Kidul, Yogyakarta, couples become acquainted through Facebook and continuing their relationships until girls became pregnant. Under Indonesian law underage marriage is prosecuted as sexual abuse, though unregistered marriages between young girls and older men are common in rural areas. In one case that caused a nationwide outcry, a wealthy Muslim cleric married a 12-year-old girl. He was prosecuted for sexually abusing a minor and sentenced to 4 years in jail.

Among the Atjeh of Sumatra girls formerly married before puberty. The husbands, though usually older, were still unfit for sexual union.

 Malaysia 

In June 2018, the Malaysian public learned that a 41-year-old Malaysian man had married an 11-year-old girl in Golok, a border town in southern Thailand. The man, who already had two wives and six children, was the imam of a surau at a village in Gua Musang, Kelantan. The parents of the 11-year-old girl defended their decision to allow their daughter's marriage to the man.

In response to this incident, Deputy Prime Minister Datuk Seri Wan Azizah Wan Ismail said that the marriage remained valid under Islam. She also said in a press statement that “the Malaysian government ‘unequivocally’ opposes child marriages and is already taking steps to raise the minimum age of marriage to 18”.

Minister in the Prime Minister's Department, Datuk Mujahid Yusof Rawa, proposed a blanket ban on marriages involving minors. In response, PAS Vice President Datuk Mohd Amar Nik Abdullah said that imposing a blanket ban on child marriage contradicts Islamic religious teachings and could not be accepted. He also said it would be better to enforce existing laws to protect children from being forced into early marriages.

In July 2018 another case of a child bride was reported in Malaysia, involving a 19-year-old man from Terengganu and a 13-year-old girl from Kelantan.

In August 2018, Selangor announced plans for an amendment to the Islamic Family Law (State of Selangor) Enactment 2003 which would raise the minimum age of marriage for Muslim women from 16 to 18 years.

Another child marriage case was covered by the media in September 2018.

Malaysia planned to tighten the requirements for child marriages in 2019. Subsequently, any marriage with minors would have to go through a stringent approval process involving Shariah Court Department, the Home Ministry, State Religious Council and Customary Courts.

 Philippines 
In December 2021, President Rodrigo Duterte signed a law criminalizing child marriage, including its facilitation and solemnization, and cohabitation of an adult with a child outside wedlock.

Before the law change, the legal age for marriage was 18 for most Filipinos, however Muslim Filipino boys were able to marry from age 15, and Muslim girls from puberty.

According to UNICEF, 15% of Filipino girls were married before age 18, and 2% were married by 15. mostly in the Muslim-dominated Autonomous Region in Muslim Mindanao region

Bangladesh
Child marriage rates in Bangladesh are amongst the highest in the world. Every 2 out of 3 marriages involve child marriages. According to statistics from 2005, 49% of women then between 25 and 29 were married by the age of 15 in Bangladesh. According to a 2008 study, for each additional year a girl in rural Bangladesh is not married she will attend school an additional 0.22 years on average. The later girls were married, the more likely they were to utilize preventive health care. Married girls in the region were found to have less influence on family planning, higher rates of maternal mortality, and lower status in their husband's family than girls who married later. Another study found that women who married at age 18 or older were less likely to experience IPV (intimate partner violence) than those married before age 18. It also found that girls married before age 15 were at an even higher risk for IPV.

India

According to UNICEF's "State of the World's Children-2009" report, 47% of India's women aged 20–24 married before the legal age of 18, with 56% marrying before age 18 in rural areas. The report also showed that 40% of the world's child marriages occur in India. As with Africa, this UNICEF report is based on data that is derived from a small sample survey in 1999. The latest available UNICEF report for India uses 2004–2005 household survey data, on a small sample, and other scholars report lower incidence rates for India. According to Raj et al., the 2005 small sample household survey data suggests 22% of girls ever married aged 16–18, 20% of girls in India married between 13 and 16, and 2.6% married before age 13. According to 2011 nationwide census of India, the average age of marriage for women in India is 21. The child marriage rates in India, according to a 2009 representative survey, dropped to 7%. In its 2001 demographic report, the Census of India stated zero married girls below age 10, 1.4 million married girls out of 59.2 million girls in the age 10–14, and 11.3 million married girls out of 46.3 million girls in the age 15–19 (which includes 18–19 age group). For 2011, the Census of India reports child marriage rates dropping further to 3.7% of females aged less than 18 being married.

The Child Marriage Restraint Act 1929 was passed during the tenure of British rule on Colonial India. It forbade the marriage of a male younger than 21 or a female younger than 18 for Hindus, Buddhists, Christians and most people of India. However, this law did not and currently does not apply to India's 165 million Muslim population, and only applies to India's Hindu, Christian, Jain, Sikh and other religious minorities. This link of law and religion was formalized by the British colonial rule with the Muslim personal laws codified in the Indian Muslim Personal Law (Shariat) Application Act of 1937. The age at which India's Muslim girls can legally marry, according to this Muslim Personal Law, is 9, and can be lower if her guardian (wali) decides she is sexually mature. Over the last 25 years, All India Muslim Personal Law Board and other Muslim civil organizations have actively opposed India-wide laws and enforcement action against child marriages; they have argued that Indian Muslim families have a religious right to marry a girl aged 15 or even 12. Several states of India claim specially high child marriage rates in their Muslim and tribal communities. India, with a population of over 1.2 billion, has the world's highest total number of child marriages. It is a significant social issue. As of 2016, the situation has been legally rectified by The Prohibition of Child Marriage Act, 2006.

According to "National Plan of Action for Children 2005", published by Indian government's Department of Women and Child Development, set a goal to eliminate child marriage completely by 2010. In 2006, The Prohibition of Child Marriage Act, 2006 was passed to prohibit solemnization of child marriages. This law states that men must be at least 21 years of age and women must but be at least 18 years of age to marry.

Some Muslim organizations planned to challenge the new law in the Supreme Court of India. In latter years, various high courts in India – including the Gujarat High Court, the Karnataka High Court and the Madras High Court – have ruled that the act prevails over any personal law (including Muslim personal law).

Nepal

UNICEF reported that 28.8% of marriages in Nepal were child marriages as of 2011. A UNICEF discussion paper determined that 79.6 percent of Muslim girls in Nepal, 69.7 percent of girls living in hilly regions irrespective of religion, and 55.7 percent of girls living in other rural areas, are all married before the age of 15. Girls born into the highest wealth quintile marry about two years later than those from the other quintiles.

Pakistan

According to a UNICEF report from 2018, around 18% of the girls in Pakistan were married before the age of 18Atlas: Pakistan. Girls Not Brides. 31 July 2021 and 4% of the girls were married before the age of 15. In the past two 2013 reports suggest that over 50% of all marriages in Pakistan involve girls less than 18 years old.

The exact number of child marriages in Pakistan below the age of 13 is unknown, but rising according to the United Nations.

Another custom in Pakistan, called swara or vani, involves village elders solving family disputes or settling unpaid debts by marrying off girls. The average marriage age of swara girls is between 5 and 9. Similarly, the custom of watta satta has been cited as a cause of child marriages in Pakistan.

According to Population Council, 35% of all females in Pakistan become mothers before they reach the age of 18, and 67% have experienced pregnancy – 69% of these have given birth – before they reach the age of 19. Less than 4% of married girls below the age of 19 had some say in choosing her spouse; over 80% were married to a near or distant relative. Child marriage and early motherhood is common in Pakistan.

Iran
In Iran, as in other developing societies, the phenomenon of child marriage, or early child marriage, is widespread. According to the official statistics of Iran in 2013, as many as 187,000 marriages of children under the legal age were registered with the country's Civil Registration Organisation. The vice president of prevention of social harms of the government's welfare organisation stated that, in 2016, 17% of girls’ marriages in Iran took place before they reached the age of 18. The border provinces of Khorasan Razavi, East Azarbaijan, and Sistan and Baluchistan are the three provinces where the highest number of child marriages occur.

Though the legal age of marriage in Iran is 13 years for girls and 15 for boys, there are cases of girls below the age of 10 being married. The same source pointed out that "child marriages are more common in socially backward rural areas often afflicted with high levels of illiteracy and drug addiction". In October 2019, a prosecutor annulled the marriage of an 11-year-old girl to her adult cousin in rural Iran, and said he was indicting the mullah (officiant) and the girl's parents for an illegal underage marriage. According to the Iranian Students News Agency, nearly 6,000 children are married each year in Iran.

The U.N. Committee on the Rights of the Child (CRC) examining child marriage in Iran has warned of a rising number of young girls forced into marriage in Iran. The Committee deplored the fact that the State party allows sexual intercourse involving girls as young as 9 lunar years and that other forms of sexual abuse of even younger children is not criminalized.
CRC said that Tehran must "repeal all provisions that authorize, condone or lead to child sexual abuse" and called for the age of sexual consent to be increased from nine years old to 16. The Society For Protecting The Rights of The Child said that 43,459 girls aged under 15 married in 2009. In 2010, 716 girls under the age of 10 married, up from 449 in the year prior. On 8 March 2018 a member of the Tehran City Council, Shahrbanoo Amani said that there were 15,000 widows under the age of 15 in the country.

The Iranian Government has been criticised by the international community over its high rate of child marriage.

In August 2019, Iran demonstrated its sensitivity towards its birth rates by arresting Kameel Ahmady, an expert in the area of child marriage, and sentencing him to a nine-year and three-month imprisonment for alleged "subversive research." Ahmady's research focuses on harmful tradition practices such as early child marriage, female genital mutilation (FGM), sexuality and the LGBTQ+ community, child labour and ethnic issues. His group fieldwork research on child marriage, carried out in 2017 and published under the title An Echo of Silence: A Comprehensive Research Study on Early Child Marriage (ECM) in Iran, brought him to the attention of the authorities because they believed he was campaigning to raise the legal age of marriage for girls.Ahmady, Kameel. THE NEXUS BETWEEN TEMPORARY MARRIAGE AND EARLY CHILD MARRIAGE IN IRAN, Paper presented at the 14th Eurasian Conference on Language and Social Sciences Hosted by University of Gjakova‘Fehmi Agani, KOSOVO, pp. 376-391, Jan 2022.

Europe

General
Each European country has its own laws; in both the European Union and the Council of Europe the marriageable age falls within the jurisdiction of individual member states. The Istanbul convention, the first legally binding instrument in Europe in the field of violence against women and domestic violence, only requires countries which ratify it to prohibit forced marriage (Article 37) and to ensure that forced marriages can be easily voided without further victimization (Article 32), but does not make any reference to a minimum age of marriage.

European Union
In the European Union, the general age of marriage as a right is 18 in all member states. When all exceptions are taken into account (such as judicial or parental consent), the minimum age is 16 in most countries, and in Estonia it is 15. In 6 countries marriage under 18 is completely prohibited. By contrast, in 6 countries there is no set minimum age, although all these countries require the authorization of a public authority (such as judge or social worker) for the marriage to take place.

Scandinavia
In April 2016, Reuters reported "Child brides sometimes tolerated in Nordic asylum centers despite bans". For example, at least 70 girls under 18 were living as married couples in Sweden; in Norway, "some" under 16 lived "with their partners". In Denmark, it was determined there were "dozens of cases of girls living with older men", prompting Minister Inger Stojberg to state she would "stop housing child brides in asylum centers".

Marriage under 18 was completely banned in Sweden in 2014, in Denmark in 2017, and in Finland in 2019.

Balkans/Eastern Europe
In these areas, child and forced marriages are associated with the Roma community and with some rural populations. However, such marriages are illegal in most of the countries from that area. In recent years, many of those countries have taken steps in order to curb these practices, including equalizing the marriageable age of both sexes (e.g. Romania in 2007, Ukraine in 2012). Therefore, most of those 'marriages' are informal unions (without legal recognition) and often arranged from very young ages. Such practices are common in Serbia, Bulgaria and Romania (in these countries the marriageable age is 18, and can only be lowered to 16 in special circumstances with judicial approvalhttp://kenarova.com/law/Family%20Code.pdf ). A 2003 case involving the daughter of an informal 'gypsy king' of the area has made international news.

BelgiumThe Washington Post reported in April 2016 that "17 child brides" arrived in Belgium in 2015 and a further 7 so far in 2016. The same report added that "Between 2010 and 2013, the police registered at least 56 complaints about a forced marriage."

 Germany 
In 2016 there were 1475 underage foreigners were registered in Germany, of which 1100 were girls. Syrians represented 664, Afghans 157 and Iraqis 100. In July 2016, 361 foreign children under 14 were registered as married.

Netherlands
The Dutch government's National Rapporteur on Trafficking in Human Beings and Sexual Violence against Children wrote that "between September 2015 and January 2016 around 60 child brides entered the Netherlands". At least one was 14 years old. The Washington Post reported that asylum centers in the Netherlands were "housing 20 child brides between ages 13 and 15" in 2015.

Russia
The common marriageable age established by the Family Code of Russia is 18 years old. Marriages of persons at age from 16 to 18 years allowed only with good reasons and by local municipal authority permission. Marriage before 16 years old may be allowed by federal subject of Russia law as an exception just in special circumstances.

By 2016, a minimum age for marriage in special circumstances had been established at 14 years (in Adygea, Kaluga Oblast, Magadan Oblast, Moscow Oblast, Nizhny Novgorod Oblast, Novgorod Oblast, Oryol Oblast, Sakhalin Oblast, Tambov Oblast, Tatarstan, Vologda Oblast) or to 15 years (in Murmansk Oblast and Ryazan Oblast). Others subjects of Russia also can have marriageable age laws.

Abatement of marriageable age is an ultimate measure acceptable in cases of life threat, pregnancy and childbirth.

United Kingdom
The marriageable age in both England and Wales is 18 with no exemptions since 1 May 2022 (16 with consent of both parents or guardians, plus also a magistrate approval required within Northern Ireland only), although in Scotland no parental consent is required over 16. Scotland and Andorra are the only European jurisdictions where 16 year-olds can marry as a right (i.e. without parental or court approval); see .

In the UK girls as young as 12 have been smuggled in to be brides of men in the Muslim community, according to a 2004 report in The Guardian. Girls trying to escape this child marriage can face death because this breaks the honor code of her husband and both families.

As with the United States, underage cohabitation is observed in the United Kingdom. According to a 2005 study, 4.1% of all girls in the 15–19 age group in the UK were cohabiting (living in an informal union), while 8.9% of all girls in that age group admitted to having been in a cohabitation relation (child marriage per UNICEF definition), before the age of 18. Over 4% of all underage girls in the UK were teenage mothers.

In July 2014, the United Kingdom hosted its first global Girl Summit; the goal of the Summit was to increase efforts to end child, early, and forced marriage and female genital mutilation within a generation.

Oceania

The Marquesas Islands have been noted for their sexual culture. Many sexual activities seen as taboo in Western cultures are viewed appropriate by the native culture. One of these differences is that children are introduced and educated to sex at a very young age. Contact with Western societies has changed many of these customs, so research into their pre-Western social history has to be done by reading antique writings. Children slept in the same room as their parents and were able to witness their parents while they had sex. Intercourse simulation became real penetration as soon as boys were physically able. Adults found simulation of sex by children to be funny. As children approached 11 attitudes shifted toward girls. When a child reaches adulthood, they are educated on sexual techniques by a much older adult.

Yuri Lisyansky in his memoirs reports that:

Adam Johann von Krusenstern in his book about the same expedition as Yuri's, reports that a father brought a 10- to 12-year-old girl on his ship, and she had sex with the crew. According to the book of Charles Pierre Claret de Fleurieu and Étienne Marchand, eight-year-old girls had sex and other unnatural acts in public.

Consequences

Child marriage has lasting consequences on girls that last well beyond adolescence.Bunting, Annie. 2005. Stages of development: marriage of girls and teens as an international human rights issue. Social and Legal Studies 14(2):17–38 Women married in their teens or earlier struggle with the health effects of pregnancy at a young age and often with little spacing between children. Early marriages followed by teen pregnancy also significantly increase birth complications and social isolation. In poor countries, early pregnancy limits or can even eliminate a woman's education options, affecting her economic independence. Girls in child marriages are more likely to suffer from domestic violence, child sexual abuse, and marital rape.

Health
Child marriage threatens the health and life of girls. Complications from pregnancy and childbirth are the main cause of death among adolescent girls below age 19 in developing countries. Girls aged 15 to 19 are twice as likely to die in childbirth as fully-grown women in their 20s, and girls under the age of 15 are five to seven times more likely to die during childbirth. These consequences are due largely to girls' physical immaturity wherefore the pelvis and birth canal are not fully developed. Teen pregnancy, particularly below age 15, increases risk of developing obstetric fistula, since their smaller pelvises make them prone to obstructed labor. Girls who give birth before the age of 15 have an 88% risk of developing fistula. and those between 18 and 15 have a 25% chance. Fistula leaves its victims with urine or fecal incontinence that causes lifelong complications with infection and pain. Unless surgically repaired, obstetric fistulas can cause years of permanent disability, shame to mothers, and can result in being shunned by the community. Married girls also have a higher risk of sexually transmitted infections, cervical cancer, and malaria than non-married peers or girls who marry in their 20s.

Child marriage also threatens the lives of offspring. Mothers under the age of 18 years have 35 to 55% increased risk of delivering pre-term or having a low birth weight baby than a mother who is 19 or 20 years old. In addition, infant mortality rates are 60% higher when the mother is under 18 years old. Infants born to child mothers tend to have weaker immune systems and face a heightened risk of malnutrition.

Prevalence of child marriage may also be associated with higher rates of population growth, more cases of children left orphaned, and the accelerated spread of disease which for many translate into prolonged poverty.

Illiteracy and poverty
Child marriage often ends a girl's education, particularly in impoverished countries where child marriages are common. In addition, uneducated girls are more at risk for child marriage. Girls who have only a primary education are twice as likely to marry before age 18 than those with a secondary or higher education, and girls with no education are three times more likely to marry before age 18 than those with a secondary education. Early marriage impedes a young girl's ability to continue with her education as most drop out of school following marriage to focus their attention on domestic duties and having or raising children. Girls may be taken out of school years before they are married due to family or community beliefs that allocating resources for girls' education is unnecessary given that her primary roles will be that of wife and mother. Without education, girls and adult women have fewer opportunities to earn an income and financially provide for themselves and their children. This makes girls more vulnerable to persistent poverty if their spouses die, abandon them, or divorce them. Given that girls in child marriages are often significantly younger than their husbands, they become widowed earlier in life and may face associated economic and social challenges for a greater portion of their life than women who marry later.

Domestic violence
Married teenage girls with low levels of education suffer greater risk of social isolation and domestic violence than more educated women who marry as adults.Haberland, Nicole, Eric L. Chong, and Hillary J. Bracken. 2006. A world apart: the disadvantage and social isolation of married adolescent girls. Brief based on background paper prepared for the WHO/UNFPA/Population Council Technical Consultation on Married Adolescents. New York: The Population Council Following marriage, girls frequently relocate to their husband's home and take on the domestic role of being a wife, which often involves relocating to another village or area. This transition may result in a young girl dropping out of school, moving away from her family and friends, and a loss of the social support that she once had. A husband's family may also have higher expectations for the girl's submissiveness to her husband and his family because of her youth. This sense of isolation from a support system can have severe mental health implications including depression.

Large age gaps between the child and her spouse makes her more vulnerable to domestic violence and marital rape. Girls who marry as children face severe and life-threatening marital violence at higher rates. Husbands in child marriages are often more than ten years older than their wives. This can increase the power and control a husband has over his wife and contribute to prevalence of spousal violence. Early marriage places young girls in a vulnerable situation of being completely dependent on her husband. Domestic and sexual violence from their husbands has lifelong, devastating mental health consequences for young girls because they are at a formative stage of psychological development. These mental health consequences of spousal violence can include depression and suicidal thoughts. Child brides, particularly in situations such as vani, also face social isolation, emotional abuse and discrimination in the homes of their husbands and in-laws.

Women's rights
The United Nations, through a series of conventions has declared child marriage a violation of human rights. The Convention on the Elimination of all Forms of Discrimination of Women ('CEDAW'), the Committee on the Rights of the Child ('CRC'), and the Universal Declaration of Human Rights form the international standard against child marriage. Child marriages impact violates a range of women's interconnected rights such as equality on grounds of sex and age, to receive the highest attainable standard of health, to be free from slavery, access to education, freedom of movement, freedom from violence, reproductive rights, and the right to consensual marriage. The consequence of these violations impact woman, her children and the broader society.

 Development 
High rates of child marriage negatively impact countries' economic development because of early marriages' impact on girls' education and labor market participation. Some researchers and activists note that high rates of child marriage prevent significant progress toward each of the eight Millennium Development Goals and global efforts to reduce poverty due to its effects on educational attainment, economic and political participation, and health.

A UNICEF Nepal issued report noted that child marriage impacts Nepal's development due to loss of productivity, poverty, and health effects. Using Nepal Multi-Indicator Survey data, its researchers estimate that all girls delaying marriage until age 20 and after would increase cash flow among Nepali women in an amount equal to 3.87% of the country's GDP. Their estimates considered decreased education and employment among girls in child marriages in addition to low rates of education and high rates of poverty among children from child marriages.

 Prevention 

Child marriage is always forced marriage, according to the United Nations, because children cannot give full informed consent to marriage. Many organizations offer ways to help prevent child marriage and forced marriage. 

 For children 

Child marriage is illegal in many places. However, children who have been forced into marriage have not broken the law. There are organizations that offer help, such as housing and legal aid, to children who are trying to escape or prevent a marriage.

 In the United States 

A child who has been forced into a marriage has not broken any laws in the United States and is not at fault. The U.S. government is opposed to child marriage, and offers legal help and social services to children who have been forced to marry. Children in the United States who need to prevent or leave a forced marriage can call the National Domestic Violence Hotline.

 In Europe 

In the United Kingdom, when anything is done to make someone marry before they turn 18 the government of the UK considers this to be a forced marriage, which is not a lawful marriage. The Forced Marriage Unit offers help to children facing a forced marriage.

In the Netherlands, the minimum age to marry is 18. Forcing someone to marry is unlawful, even if the marriage took place outside the Netherlands. Children who have been forced to marry may contact National Expertise Centre on Forced Marriage and Abandonment for help.

International initiatives

In December 2011 a resolution adopted by the United Nations General Assembly (A/RES/66/170) designated 11 October as the International Day of the Girl Child. On 11 October 2012 the first International Day of the Girl Child'' was held, the theme of which was ending child marriage.

In 2013 the first United Nations Human Rights Council resolution against child, early, and forced marriages was adopted; it recognizes child marriage as a human rights violation and pledges to eliminate the practice as part of the U.N.'s post-2015 global development agenda.

In 2014 the UN's Commission on the Status of Women issued a document in which they agreed, among other things, to eliminate child marriage.

The World Health Organization recommends increased educational attainment among girls, increased enforcement structures for existing minimum marriage age laws, and informing parents in practicing communities of the risks associated as primary methods to prevent child marriages.

Programs to prevent child marriage have taken several different approaches. Various initiatives have aimed to empower young girls, educate parents on the associated risks, change community perceptions, support girls' education, and provide economic opportunities for girls and their families through means other than marriage. A survey of a variety of prevention programs found that initiatives were most effect when they combined efforts to address financial constraints, education, and limited employment of women.

Girls in families participating in an unconditional cash transfer program in Malawi aimed at incentivizing girls' education married and had children later than their peers who had not participated in the program. The program's effects on rates of child marriage were greater for unconditional cast transfer programs than those with conditions. Evaluators believe this demonstrated that the economic needs of the family heavily influenced the appeal of child marriage in this community. Therefore, reducing financial pressures on the family decreased the economic motivations to marry daughters off at a young age.

The Haryana state government in India operated a program in which poor families were given a financial incentive if they kept their daughters in school and unmarried until age 18. Girls in families who were eligible for the program were less likely to be married before age 18 than their peers.

A similar program was operated in 2004 by the Population Council and the regional government in Ethiopia's rural Amhara Region. Families received cash if their daughters remained in school and unmarried during the two years of the program. They also instituted mentorship programs, livelihood training, community conversations about girls' education and child marriage, and gave school supplies for girls. After the two-year program, girls in families eligible for the program were three times more likely to be in school and one tenth as likely to be married compared to their peers.

In the other free program the Global Campaign for the Prevention of Child Marriage (GCPCM) has been launched in March 2019, and the primary goal of this Campaign is raising awareness and illuminating people's minds to address child marriage in the world. 
 
Other programs have addressed child marriage less directly through a variety of programming related to girls' empowerment, education, sexual and reproductive health, financial literacy, life skills, communication skills, and community mobilization.

In 2018, UN Women announced that Jaha Dukureh would serve as Goodwill Ambassador in Africa to help organize to prevent child marriage.

Tipping point analysis 
Researchers at the International Center for Research on Women found that in some communities rates of child marriage increase significantly when girls are a particular age. This "tipping point", or age at which rates of marriage increase dramatically, may occur years before the median age of marriage. Therefore, the researchers argue prevention programs should focus their programming on girls who are pre-tipping point age rather than only girls who are married before they reach the median age for marriage.

Prevalence data

See also
 Because I Am a Girl
 Child sexuality
 Arranged marriage
 Watta satta
 Karo kari
 Baad (practice)
 Jirga
 Women related laws in Pakistan
 Forced marriage
 Vani (custom)
 Jewish views on marriage
 List of child brides
 List of child bridegrooms
 Marriageable age
 Marriage in Islam
 Supplementary Convention on the Abolition of Slavery
 Teenage marriage
 Teenage pregnancy
 Westermarck effect

Notes

References

Works cited

External links

UN Population Fund on Child Marriage

 
Arranged marriage